Daniel Joseph Anthony Meehan (2 March 1943 – 28 November 2005), professionally known as Tony Meehan, was a founder member of the British group the Drifters, with Jet Harris, Hank Marvin and Bruce Welch, which would evolve into the Shadows. He played drums on early Cliff Richard and the Shadows hits and on early Shadows instrumentals.

Meehan was professionally nicknamed "The Baron" by his many admirers and friends within the British pop-rock music industry. He is reckoned to have influenced many thousands of teenage boys and adolescents to take up music as a career, including Mick Fleetwood of Fleetwood Mac, as a result of his iconic film performance in Cliff Richard's film The Young Ones. 
His drumming style (cf. "Bongo Blues", "Apache") is noticeably different from that of other drummers that the Shadows employed during 1958–2010 such as Brian Bennett, Clem Cattini and Trevor Spencer. In his contribution to the 1961 book The Shadows by Themselves, Meehan gives advice to all would-be drummers on drum-kit care and maintenance.

Biography
Tony Meehan was born to Irish parents at New End Hospital, New End, Hampstead, North West London, England. He was 10 when he became interested in playing drums. By 13, he had his first job with a band playing in a dance hall at Willesden, London. He also played timpani with the London Youth Orchestra. When he was 15, Meehan was set on becoming a lawyer but he was offered a job at £25 per week in a touring show. He was given six months' holiday. The tour never materialised but he did not go back to school. Unlike other members of the Shadows he was never short of work, playing cabaret at Churchill's and the Stork Club. He also played with Jet Harris in "The Vipers". 

Meehan left the Shadows in October 1961 to work as an arranger/producer and session drummer for Joe Meek (John Leyton, Michael Cox: "Young Only Once", Andy Cavell) and from early 1962 at Decca Records. He teamed again with Harris (who had also left the Shadows and moved to Decca) and as a duo had success with the instrumental "Diamonds" which also included Jimmy Page on acoustic rhythm guitar. "Diamonds" was a number one hit in the UK. Harris and Meehan had two further hit singles together – "Scarlett O'Hara" and "Applejack".

On 1 January 1962, the Beatles were auditioned at Decca by Meehan, performing a selection of covers they had performed in various clubs over the years, interspersed with three Lennon–McCartney originals. The Beatles later found out that their manager Brian Epstein had paid Meehan to produce the recordings made that day in order for the Beatles to retain ownership of the tapes. Decca rejected the Beatles choosing the Tremeloes, who auditioned the same day as the Beatles. After talks with Epstein, Decca did arrange for Meehan to produce the Beatles at Decca if the Beatles manager agreed to cover the expenses of about £100. On 7 February 1962, Epstein met Meehan, who made condescending comments about the Beatles’ audition. With the meeting not going well and Epstein not impressed with Meehan, Epstein rejected the Decca offer.

Meehan briefly played with the Shadows some years later when Brian Bennett was in hospital. At one point, John Rostill was in hospital at the same time, and the Shadows were playing live with Brian Locking on bass and Meehan on drums.

Meehan quit the music industry in the 1990s for a major career change as a psychologist, as a result of a lifelong hobby/interest. He worked in London at a local college lecturing in psychology until his death. He was a regular churchgoer at his local Roman Catholic church in Maida Vale.

Early career groups (pre-Shadows/Drifters)
1956 – (Skiffle Trio)
John Kessler (g/v), Tony Kessler (guitar) and Tony Meehan (drums)

1956–57 – (Trad-Irish-band)
Billy Flynn (g/v), Raymond Cleary (g), David Rees (b) and Tony Meehan (wb)

1958 – The Vipers
Wally Whyton (vocals/guitar), Johnny Booker (vocals/guitar), Freddy Lloyd (vocals/guitar) Jet Harris (b) and Tony Meehan (drums)

Drums career usage

1954–1958: Ajax
1959–1961: Gretsch (The Drifters); (The Shadows)
196?–196?: Trixon  (The Shadows)
196?–196?: Ludwig (The Shadows)
1962–1963: Gretsch (Jet Harris and Tony Meehan)
1963–1964: Gretsch (Tony Meehan)
1964–1970: Gretsch (Tony Meehan) 
1970-1975  Premier endorsement

Death
On 29 November 2005, BBC News quoted Bruce Welch as saying that Meehan had died the previous day, as a result of head injuries, following a fall down the main staircase at his London flat in Maida Vale. Meehan died at St Mary's Hospital, Paddington, London.

At his death, Meehan had been twice married and had seven children.

Groupography
The Vipers Skiffle Group
The Drifters
Cliff Richard and the Drifters
The Shadows
Cliff Richard and the Shadows
Jet Harris & Tony Meehan
The Tony Meehan Combo

Discography

Performance credits
Cliff Richard And The Shadows – "Cliff Sings" – 1959 /1960 (Columbia/ABC Paramount)
Cliff Richard And The Shadows – "Me And My Shadows" – 1960 (Columbia)
Cliff Richard And The Shadows – "The Young Ones" – 1961 (Columbia)
Cliff Richard And The Shadows – "Move It" – 1958 (Columbia)
Cliff Richard And The Shadows – "Living Doll" – 1959 (Columbia)
The Shadows – "Apache" – 1960 (Columbia)
The Shadows – "Wonderful Land" – 1960 (Columbia)
The Shadows – "Man of Mystery" – 1960 (Columbia)
The Shadows – "The Shadows" – 1961 (Columbia)
The Shadows – "Kon-Tiki" – 1961 (Columbia)
The Shadows – "F.B.I." – 1961 (Columbia)
The Shadows – "See You In My Drums" – 1961 (Columbia)
The Shadows – "Meeting with the Shadows" – 1962 (Columbia – 33QPX 8027)
Roger Daltrey – "Ride A Rock Horse" – 1975 (Track / MCA)

As Jet Harris and Tony Meehan

Albums
Remembering – LP – Decca
Best of – CD
Diamonds and Gems – CD

Singles
"Diamonds" / "Footstomp" – 7" – Decca, #1 on British charts
"Scarlett O'Hara" / "Hully Gully" – 7" – Decca  #2 on British charts
"Applejack" / "Tall Texan" – 7" – Decca, #4 on British charts

EPs
Jet and Tony – EP – Decca 33 on British EP charts

As solo artist
"Song of Mexico" / "Kings Go Fifth" – 7" – Decca – 1964
"Zola / Reaching Out For Gold" - 1984 (Magus)

Production credits

Albums
Donal Donnelly – Take the Name of Donnelly – 1968 (Decca)
Tim Hardin – Painted Head – 1973 (CBS)
Danny Mcbride – "Morningside" – 1973 (CBS)
John Howard – Kid in a Big World – 1975 (CBS 80473)
Kevin Westlake – Stars Fade (In Hotel Rooms) – 1976 (UTOPIA 1–1388)
Roger Daltrey – One of the Boys – 1977 (MCA)
Eric Burdon – Darkness Darkness – 1980 (Polydor)
Kim & The Cadillacs – Rock Bottom – 1980 (Ariston Music AR/LP/12379) (Italian release)

Singles
Louise Cordet – "I'm Just a Baby" / "In a Matter of Moments" – 1962 (Decca)
Jay and Tommy Scott – "Angela" / "Did You" – 1962 (Decca)
Jet Harris & Tony Meehan – Diamonds" / "Footstomp" 1963 – (Decca)
Jet Harris & Tony Meehan – "Scarlett O'Hara" / "Hully Gully" 1963 – (Decca)
Jet Harris & Tony Meehan – "Applejack" / "Tall Texan" – 1963 – (Decca)
Tony Meehan – "Song of Mexico" / "Kings Go Fifth" – 7" – Decca – 1964
Louise Cordet – "Don't Let the Sun Catch You Crying" / "Loving Baby" – 1964 (Decca)
Glyn Johns – "Old Deceiver Time" b/w "Dancing With You" 1963 (Decca F11753)
Jet Harris – "My Lady" / "You Don't Live Twice" – 1964 (Decca)
Glyn Johns – "Today You're Gone" b/w "Such Stuff Of Dreams" 1965 (Lyntone LYN 827)
Glyn Johns – "I'll Follow The Sun" b/w "I'll Take You Dancing" 1965 (Pye 7N 15818)
Glyn Johns – "Mary Anne" b/w "Like Grains Of Yellow Sand" 1965 (Immediate IM 013)
Glyn Johns – "Lady Jane" feat. Brian Jones on Sitar 1966
Les Anges – "Une Fille, Mais Qu'Est-Ce Que C'Est" ‎(7", EP) – 1967 (Odeon/EMI MEO 141) (French release)
Wishful Thinking – "Peanuts / Cherry, Cherry" – 1967 (Decca/Southern Music F 12627)
Wishful Thinking – "Meet The Sun / Easier Said Than Loving You" – 1967 (Decca F22673)
Wishful Thinking – "Count to Ten / Hang Around Girl" – 1967 (Decca F 12598)
The Dalys – "Sweet Maria / Leaving Time" – 1967 (Fontana TF 809)
The Dalys – "A Fistful Of Dollars / The Man With No Name" – 1967 (Fontana TF 841)
Richard Anthony – "Put Your Head On My Shoulder" – 1967 (Columbia/Sparta Music DB 8143)
White Trash – "Road to Nowhere" / "Illusions" – 1969 (Apple)
Trash – "Golden Slumbers/Carry That Weight" / "Trash Can" – 1969 (Apple)
Keith Meehan – "Darkness Of My Life / Hooker St." – 1969 (Marmalade)
Frabjoy And Runcible Spoon – "I'm Beside Myself / Animal Song" – 1969 (Marmalade 598019)
Hank Marvin – "Break Another Dawn / Morning Star" – 1970 (Columbia DB 8693)
Cody – "I Belong with You" / "Wanna Make You Happy" – 1971 (Polydor/Atco)
Colin Blunstone – "It's Magical / Summersong" – 1974 (Epic)
Darryl Read – "High Rise Angry Young Man" – 1981 (on "Collectomatic vol I" – LP—1997 (white label))

References

Further reading
Driftin' with Cliff Richard, by J. Harris, R. Ellis and C. Richard
The Shadows by Themselves by Royston Ellis with The Shadows. Consul Books. 1961. No ISBN.
The Story of the Shadows by Mike Read. 1983. Elm Tree books. 
That Sound (From Move It On, The Story of the Magic Sound of The Shadows), by R. Pistolesi, M. Addey and M. Mazzini. Publ: Vanni Lisanti. June 2000. No ISBN.
The Complete Rock Family Rock Trees, by Pete Frame. Omnibus. 
Guinness World Records: British Hit Singles & Albums (19th Edn), David Roberts. 
The Complete Book of the British Charts (Singles and Albums), by Neil Warwick, Jon Kutner & Tony Brown, 3rd Edn. 
Jet Harris – Survivor, by Dave Nicolson, 31 October 2009.

1943 births
2005 deaths
Accidental deaths from falls
Accidental deaths in London
English people of Irish descent
English rock drummers
British male drummers
People from Hampstead
People from Maida Vale
The Shadows members
20th-century British male musicians